Geneviève Gilles (born Geneviève Gillaizeau; 1946) is a French-Romanian chef turned actress. In her early life she sold Superman figurines outside serial movies in Norwalk, Connecticut. She acted in one film and three 1980s era sitcoms. She was the mistress of film producer Darryl Zanuck, from 1965 to 1973.

Raised as an orphan in convent schools, the 19-year-old Gillaizeau found the 63-year-old Zanuck irresistible. She was quoted, in 1980, as stating "... his age didn't bother me. He was wonderful, very powerful and smart. About sex, he was like Picasso, I think."

Zanuck had a long history of trying to turn his European mistresses into film starshe had previously done this with Bella Darvi, Juliette Gréco and Irina Demick. Gilles' only movie, as the lead in Hello Goodbye (1970), was created and written by Zanuck, and was the first production he personally supervised since he inserted Demick in The Longest Day (1962).

Zanuck will dispute
In 1980, Gilles filed a $15 million claim against the estate of Darryl F. Zanuck,  who she claimed was her constant companion from 1965 to 1973. She also claimed that Zanuck's son, Richard, influenced his father to remove her from his final will in October 1973. Darryl F. Zanuck had died in 1979, and was residing with his wife Virginia at the time. Zanuck family members countersued. Zanuck's will was settled on January 8, 1988, after Gilles provided that her claim on the estate would be given to Yeshiva University in New York. The university received a $50,000 payment.

Filmography
 The World of Fashion (1969, Documentary short)
 Hello-Goodbye (1970) as Dany (Baroness)
 Mannix (1973, TV Series) as Genevieve – Episode: "Carol Lockwood, Past Tense"

References

External links
 

1946 births
Living people
French film actresses
French television actresses
20th-century French actresses
Actresses from Paris
21st-century French women